Hrvoje (Vojko) Bartolović (15 June 1932 in Zagreb – 3 November 2005), was a Croatian chess problemist.

Croatian Grandmaster of chess composition Hrvoje Bartolović was considered to be the best Croatian chess problemist, with the possible exception of Nenad Petrović. Since 1948, he has published more than 800 problems (81 included in FIDE Album). Over 180 of them were awarded with prize (80 with the 1st prize), some 120 with honourable mentions and 120 with commendations. He became international judge of FIDE for chess composition in 1956 and the Grandmaster of chess composition in 1980. In 1965, he was the world champion in composing twomovers.

Solution of twomover
Set-play: 1. ... Bf5 2. Qf4#, 1. ... Rf5 2. Qg4# 
Try: 1. Qd5? ~ 2.Bxf6#, 1. ... Bf5 2. Qxd2#, 1. ... Rf5 2.Qg2#, but 1. ... Bxb4! 
Solution: 1. Qc5! ~ 2. Bxf6#, 1. ... Bf5 2. Qe3#, 1. ... Rf5 2. Qg1# 
Themes: Zagoruiko (changed mates 3x2) on Grimshaw interference

References

External links
 PZR Zagreb
 Bartolović's Problems on PDB server
 https://web.archive.org/web/20070929164810/http://www.problemonline.com/bartolovic/en_bartolovic.htm 
 https://web.archive.org/web/20110604092600/http://members.tripod.com/~JurajLorinc/chess/xbartolo.htm

1932 births
2005 deaths
Chess composers
Croatian chess players
Grandmasters for chess composition
International Judges of Chess Compositions
Sportspeople from Zagreb
20th-century chess players